Ganj Darreh-ye Olya (also Romanized as Ganj Darreh-ye ‘Olyā; also known as Ganjereh-ye ‘Olyā) is a village in Mirbag-e Jonubi Rural District, in the Central District of Delfan County, Lorestan Province, Iran. At the 2006 census, its population was 241, in 50 families.

References 

Towns and villages in Delfan County